Night Island is part of the Great Barrier Reef Marine Park west of Cape Melville, Queensland, Australia. It lies east of Coen between the first three-mile opening and the second three-mile opening of the Barrier Reef about 100 km south-east of Lockhart River. It is part of the Islands North of Port Stewart Important Bird Area.
The indigenous people of the island were the Kawadji.

Notes and references

Explanatory notes

Notes

References

Islands on the Great Barrier Reef
Important Bird Areas of Queensland
Islands of Far North Queensland
Great Barrier Reef Marine Park